The 2016 World Aesthetic Gymnastics Championships, the 17th edition of the Aesthetic group gymnastics competition, was held in Brno, Czech Republic from June 9 to 12, at the Sport hall Vodova.

Participating nations

Medal winners

Results

Senior

The top 12 teams (2 per country) and the host country in Preliminaries qualify to the Finals.

References

External links
http://www.ifagg.com/event/world-championship-brno-czech-rep/?instance_id=283
https://web.archive.org/web/20160717072442/http://wcagg2016.cz/
https://web.archive.org/web/20170503034633/http://wcagg2016.cz/wp-content/uploads/2016/02/WCAGG-results-sen.pdf

World Aesthetic Gymnastics Championships
World Aesthetic
International gymnastics competitions hosted by the Czech Republic 
2016 in gymnastics
Sport in Brno